PJSC AeroflotRussian Airlines, commonly known as Aeroflot ( or ; ,), is the flag carrier and the largest airline of Russia. The airline was founded in 1923, making Aeroflot one of the oldest active airlines in the world. Aeroflot is headquartered in the Central Administrative Okrug, Moscow, with its hub being Sheremetyevo International Airport.

Before the 2022 Russian invasion of Ukraine, the airline flew to 146 destinations in 52 countries, excluding codeshared services. The number of destinations was significantly reduced after many countries banned Russian aircraft; as of 8 March 2022, Aeroflot flies only to destinations in Russia and Belarus.

From its inception to the early 1990s, Aeroflot was the flag carrier and a state-owned enterprise of the Soviet Union (USSR). During this time, Aeroflot grew its fleet to over five thousand domestically made aircraft and expanded to operate a domestic and international flight network of over three thousand destinations throughout the Soviet Union and the globe, making the airline the largest in the world at the time. In addition to passenger flights, Aeroflot also committed to freight operations and serving the state through transportation and military assistance. Following the dissolution of the USSR, the carrier was restructured into an open joint-stock company and embarked on a radical transformation process. Aeroflot shrank the fleet dramatically while at the same time purchasing Western aircraft and newer domestic models and focusing on expanding its international market share before moving to boost its domestic market share.

By the end of 2017, Aeroflot controlled roughly 40% of the air market in Russia. Aeroflot owns Rossiya Airlines – an airline based in Saint Petersburg, Pobeda – a low-cost carrier, and 51% of airline Aurora, based in the Russian Far East. Altogether, Aeroflot and its subsidiaries own 359 aircraft as of 31 December 2019, composed mainly of Airbus, Boeing, and domestic models such as the Sukhoi Superjet 100, and today's Russified MC-21. Aeroflot also formerly had a cargo subsidiary named Aeroflot-Cargo, though the branch later merged with the parent airline.

Aeroflot became a member of SkyTeam in April 2006, making it the first carrier in the former Soviet Union to do so. In 2022, SkyTeam and Aeroflot agreed to temporarily suspend the airline's membership, one of many corporate responses to the 2022 Russian invasion of Ukraine. As of March 2020, the Government of Russia owns 51% of Aeroflot through the Federal Agency for State Property Management, with the rest of the shares being free-floating.

History

Early history of Soviet civil aviation 

On 17 January 1921, the Sovnarkom of the Russian Soviet Federative Socialist Republic published "About Air Transportation". The document signed by its chair Vladimir Lenin set out the basic regulations on air transport over the territory of the RSFSR. The document was significant as it was the first time that a Russian state had declared sovereignty over its airspace. In addition, the document defined rules for the operation of foreign aircraft over the Soviet Union's airspace and territory. After Lenin issued an order, a State Commission was formed on 31 January 1921 for the purpose of civil aviation planning in the Soviet Union. As a result of the commission's plans, Glavvozdukhflot (Chief Administration of the Civil Air Fleet) was established, and it began mail and passenger flights on the Moscow-Oryol-Kursk-Kharkov route on 1 May 1921 using Sikorsky Ilya Muromets aircraft. This was followed by the formation of Deruluft-Deutsch Russische Luftverkehrs A.G. in Berlin on 11 November 1921, as a joint venture between the Soviet Union and Germany. The company, whose aircraft were registered in both Germany and the Soviet Union, began operations on 1 May 1922 with a Fokker F.III flying between Königsberg and Moscow. The service was initially operated twice a week and restricted to the carriage of mail.

On 3 February 1923 Sovnarkom approved plans for the expansion of the Red Air Fleet, and it is this date which was officially recognised as the beginning of civil aviation in the Soviet Union. After a resolution of the Central Committee of the Communist Party of the Soviet Union, the Enterprise for Friends of the Air Fleet (ODVF) was founded on 8 March 1923, followed by the formation of Dobrolet on 17 March 1923. The artist Alexander Rodchenko became involved in the ODVF at this time. He designed posters encouraging citizens to buy stock in Dobrolet and the famous "Winged Hammer and Sickle" logo still used by Aeroflot. Regular flights by Dobrolet from Moscow to Nizhniy Novgorod commenced on 15 July 1923. During the same period, an additional two airlines were established; Zakavia being based in Tiflis, and Ukrvozdukhput based in Kharkov. During 1923 an agreement was signed establishing a subdivision of Dobrolet to be based in Tashkent, which would operate to points in Soviet Central Asia. In March 1924, Dobrolet began operating flights from Sevastopol to Yalta and Yevpatoriya in the Crimea. Dobrolet's route network was extended during the 1925–1927 period to include Kazan and regular flights between Moscow and Kharkov were inaugurated. Plans were made for Dobrolet flights to Kharkov to connect with Ukrvozdukhput services to Kyiv, Odessa and Rostov-on-Don. Dobrolet was transformed from a Russian to an all-Union enterprise on 21 September 1926 as a result of Sovnarkom resolutions, and in 1928 Dobrolet was merged with Ukrvozdukhput; the latter having merged with Zakavia in 1925.

Formative years 

Responsibility for all civil aviation activities in the Soviet Union came under the control of the Chief Directorate of the Civil Air Fleet on 25 February 1932, and on 25 March 1932 the name "Aeroflot" was officially adopted for the entire Soviet Civil Air Fleet. The Communist Party of the Soviet Union Congress in 1933 set out development plans for the civil aviation industry for the following five years, which would see air transportation becoming one of the primary means of transportation in the Soviet Union, linking all major cities. The government also implemented plans to expand the Soviet aircraft industry to make it less dependent on foreign built aircraft; in 1930 some fifty percent of aircraft flying services in the Soviet Union were of foreign manufacture. Expansion of air routes which had taken shape in the late 1920s, continued into the 1930s. The agreement between the Soviet Union and Germany relating to Deruluft expired on 1 January 1937 and wasn't renewed, which saw the joint venture carrier ceasing operations on 1 April 1937. On that date Aeroflot began operations on the Moscow to Stockholm route, and began operating the ex-Deruluft route from Leningrad to Riga utilising Douglas DC-3s and Tupolev ANT-35s (PS-35s). Flights from Moscow to Berlin, via Königsberg, were suspended until 1940, when they were restarted by Aeroflot and Deutsche Luft Hansa as a result of the signing of the Molotov–Ribbentrop Pact, and would continue until the beginning of the Great Patriotic War in 1941.

Under the third five-year plan, which began in 1938, civil aviation development continued, with improvements to airport installations being made and construction of airports being commenced. In addition to the expansion of services between the Soviet Union's main cities, local routes (MVL) were also expanded, and by 1940, some 337 MVL routes saw operations on a scheduled basis. Serial production of the Lisunov Li-2 (license-built Douglas DC-3) commenced in 1939, and the aircraft became the backbone of Aeroflot's fleet on mainline trunk routes. When the Soviet Union was invaded by Nazi Germany on 22 June 1941, the following day the Sovnarkom placed the Civil Air Fleet under the control of Narkomat, leading to the full-scale mobilisation of Aeroflot crews and technicians for the Soviet war effort. Aeroflot aircraft, including PS-35s and PS-43s, were based at Moscow's Central Airport; and important missions undertaken by Aeroflot aircraft and crews included flying supplies to the besieged cities of Leningrad, Kyiv, Odessa and Sevastopol. Following the defeat of the Wehrmacht, some 80 Junkers Ju 52/3ms were captured from the Germans, and were placed into the service of the Civil Air Fleet, and after the war were placed into regular service across the Soviet Union. Whilst civil operations in European Russia west of the front line, which ran from Leningrad to Moscow to Rostov-on-Don, were prevented from operating because of the war, services from Moscow to the Urals, Siberia, Central Asia, and other regions which were not affected by the war, continued.

Aeroflot during the Cold War 

At the end of World War II, the Soviet government went about repairing and rebuilding essential airport infrastructure, and it strengthened the Aeroflot units in the European part of the Soviet Union. Aeroflot had by the end of 1945 carried 537,000 passengers, compared with 359,000 in 1940. The government made it a priority in the immediate postwar years to expand services from Moscow to the capital of the Union republics, in addition to important industrial centres on the country. To enable this, the government transferred to Aeroflot a large number of Lisunov Li-2s, and they would become the backbone of the fleet. The Ilyushin Il-12 entered service on Aeroflot's all-Union scheduled routes on 22 August 1947, and supplemented already existing Li-2 services. The original Ilyushin Il-18 entered service around the same time as the Il-12, and was operated on routes from Moscow to Yakutsk, Khabarovsk, Vladivostok, Alma Ata, Tashkent, Sochi, Mineralnye Vody and Tbilisi. By 1950 the Il-18 was withdrawn from service, being replaced by Il-12s. MVL and general aviation services received a boost in March 1948, when the first Antonov An-2s were delivered and entered service in Central Russia. Development of MVL services over latter years was attributed to the An-2, which was operated by Aeroflot in all areas of the Soviet Union.

Night flights began in the same year, and the fifth five-year plan, covering the period 1951–1955, emphasised Aeroflot expanding night-time operations, which vastly improved aircraft utilisation. By 1952, some 700 destinations around the Soviet Union received regular flights from Aeroflot. On 30 November 1954, the Ilyushin Il-14 entered service, and the aircraft took a leading role in the operation of Aeroflot's all-Union services. The number of passengers carried in 1955 increased to 2,500,000, whilst freight and mail carriage also increased, to 194,960 and 63,760 tons, respectively. The 20th Communist Party Congress, held in 1956, saw plans for Aeroflot services to be dramatically increased. The airline would see its overall activities increased from its then current levels by 3.8 times, and it was set the target of the carriage of 16,000,000 passengers by 1960. In order to meet these goals, Aeroflot introduced higher capacity turbojet and turbine-prop aircraft on key domestic routes, and on services to Aeroflot destinations abroad. A major step for Aeroflot occurred on 15 September 1956 when the Tupolev Tu-104 jet airliner entered service on the Moscow-Omsk-Irkutsk route, marking the world's first sustained jet airline service. The airline began international flights with the type on 12 October 1956 under the command of Boris Bugayev with flights from Moscow to Prague. The aircraft placed Aeroflot in an enviable position, as airlines in the West had operated throughout the 1950s with large piston-engined aircraft. By 1958 the route network covered , and the airline carried 8,231,500 passengers, and 445,600 tons of mail and freight, with fifteen percent of all-Union services being operated by jet aircraft.

Aeroflot introduced the Antonov An-10 and Ilyushin Il-18 in 1959, and together with its existing jet aircraft, the airline was able to extend services on modern aircraft to twenty one cities during 1960. The expansion of the Aeroflot fleet saw services with modern aircraft being extended to forty one cities in 1961, with fifty percent of all-Union services being operated by these aircraft. This fleet expansion also saw the number of passengers carried in 1961 skyrocketing to 21,800,000. Further expansion came in 1962 when both the Tupolev Tu-124 and Antonov An-24 entered regular service with Aeroflot on various medium and short-haul routes. By 1964, Aeroflot operated direct flights from Moscow to 100 cities, from Leningrad to 44 cities, and from Kyiv to 38 cities. The airline also operated direct flights from Mineralnye Vody to 48 cities across the Soviet Union, denoting the importance of the operation of holiday aircraft services to Aeroflot.

For the period of the eighth five-year plan, which ran from 1966 to 1970, Aeroflot carried a total of 302,200,000 passengers, 6.47 billion tons of freight and 1.63 billion tons of mail. During the five-year plan period, all-Union services were extended over an additional 350 routes; an additional 1,000 MVL routes were begun, and 40 new routes were opened up with all-cargo flights. The year 1967 saw the introduction into service of the Ilyushin Il-62 and Tupolev Tu-134, and in September 1968 the Yakovlev Yak-40 regional jet began operations on short-haul services. That same year, the Il-62 inaugurated the long-delayed service between Moscow and New York, which finally began in July and was operated by Aeroflot and Pam Am jointly. According to the book The Aeroflot Story: From Russia With Luck: "This business relationship would become an acrimonious affair in which both parties complained it had been wronged by the other. Pan Am accused the Soviets of illegally siphoning away Moscow-to-New York passengers, whilst in turn; Aeroflot accused US consular officials in Russia of having steered passengers to Pan Am flights."

By 1970, the last year of the five-year plan period, Aeroflot was operating flights to over 3,500 destinations in the Soviet Union, and at the height of the 1970 summer holidays season, the airline was carrying approximately 400,000 passengers per day, and some ninety percent of passengers were being carried on propeller-turbine and jet aircraft. In January 1971, the Central Administration of International Air Traffic (TsUMVS) was established within the framework of IATA, and became the sole enterprise authorised to operate international flights. Abroad, the airline was known as Aeroflot Soviet Airlines. In 1976, Aeroflot carried its 100 millionth passenger. Its flights were mainly concentrated around the Soviet Union, but the airline also had an international network covering five continents: North and South America, Europe, Africa and Asia. The network included countries such as the United States, Canada, United Kingdom, Spain, Cuba, Mexico and the People's Republic of China.

Aeroflot service between the Soviet Union and the United States was interrupted from 15 September 1983 until 2 August 1990, following an executive order by U.S. President Ronald Reagan, revoking Aeroflot's license to operate flights into and out of the United States following the downing of Korean Air Lines Flight 007 by the Soviet Air Force. At the start of the 1990s Aeroflot reorganised again giving more autonomy to territorial divisions. REG Davies, former curator of the Smithsonian Institution, claims that by 1992 Aeroflot had over 600,000 people operating over 10,000 aircraft.

Other functions 

Aeroflot also performed other functions, including air ambulance; aerial application; heavy lifting for the Soviet Space Agency; offshore oil platform support; exploration and aeromagnetic survey for natural resources; support for construction projects; transport of military troops and supplies (as an adjunct to the Soviet Air Force); atmospheric research; and remote area patrol. It operated hundreds of helicopters and cargo aircraft in addition to civil airliners. It also operated the Soviet equivalent of a presidential aircraft and other VIP transports of government and Communist party officials. Aeroflot was also responsible for such services as ice patrol in the Arctic Ocean and escorting of ships through frozen seas; oil exploration; power line surveillance; and transportation and heavy lifting support on construction projects. For the latter tasks, Aeroflot used, in addition to smaller helicopters, the Mil Mi-10 flying crane capable of lifting . Hauling of heavy cargo, including vehicles, was performed by the world's largest operational helicopter, the Mil Mi-26. Its unusual eight-blade rotor enabled it to lift a maximum payload of some twenty tons. The medium- and long-range passenger- and cargo aircraft of Aeroflot were also part of the strategic air transport reserve, ready to provide immediate airlift support to the armed forces. Short-range aircraft and helicopters were available for appropriate military support missions.

Post-Soviet Aeroflot 

In the early 1990s, the Soviet Union underwent massive political upheavals, culminating in the dissolution of the State. Former republics of the Soviet Union declared their independence during January 1990 – December 1991, resulting in the establishment of several independent countries, along with fifteen republics and the Commonwealth of Independent States (CIS). Up until that time, Aeroflot had been the only establishment providing air services throughout the Soviet Union, but with its breakup Aeroflot branches of these countries began their own services, and the airline itself came under control of Russia, the largest of the CIS republics, and was renamed AeroflotRussian International Airlines (ARIA). In 1992 Aeroflot was divided into a number of regional airlines, whereas international routes were operated by ARIA. Smaller regional airlines which emerged from the old Aeroflot were sometimes referred to as Babyflots; Bashkirian Airlines, Krasnoyarsk Airlines, Moscow Airways and Tatarstan Airlines were among the carriers that were formed from former Aeroflot directorates.

In 1994, Aeroflot was registered as a joint-stock company and the government sold off 49% of its stake to Aeroflot employees. During the 1990s, Aeroflot was primarily focused on international flights from Moscow. However, by the end of the decade Aeroflot started an expansion in the domestic market. In 2000 the company name was changed to AeroflotRussian Airlines to reflect the change in the company strategy. The Aeroflot fleet shrank dramatically in the post-Soviet era, dropping from 5,400 planes in 1991 to 115 in 1996.

Since the dissolution, Aeroflot has been actively working towards promoting and redefining itself as a safe and reliable airline. In the early 2000s, the airline hired British consultants for rebranding. From the start, plans were afoot to replace the hammer and sickle logo, a symbol of Soviet communism; despite this the logo was not scrapped, as it was the most recognisable symbol of the company for over 70 years. A new livery and uniforms for flight attendants were designed and a promotional campaign launched in 2003. Its fleet has undergone a major reorganisation during which most of the Soviet aircraft were replaced by Western-built jets; concerns over fuel consumption rather than safety concerns were cited for such a move. Airbus A319s and A320s for short-haul flights in Europe; and Boeing 767s and Airbus A330s for long-haul routes; were gradually incorporated into the fleet. Aeroflot began working with the US travel technology firm Sabre Corporation in 1997, and in 2004 signed an agreement to use Sabre's software as its new Reservation System, further extending the relationship with Sabre in 2010. In the spring of 2004 an expansion on the domestic market was undertaken, aiming to gain 30% share by 2010 ( it held approximately 9%). The first task was to outperform Siberia Airlines (now S7 Airlines), a major rival and the leader in the domestic market. On 29 July 2004 a new corporate slogan was adopted: "Sincerely Yours. Aeroflot".

In , Aeroflot became the tenth airline to join SkyTeam, and the first air carrier in the former Soviet Union to do so. The company announced its plan to increase cargo operations. It registered the Aeroflot-Cargo trademark in 2006. During that year Aeroflot carried 7,290,000 passengers and 145,300 tons of mail and cargo to 89 destinations in 47 countries. It saw improvements in its earnings and number of passengers carried. The net profit reached $309.4 million (RUB 7.98 billion) in 2006, a 32.3% increase from 2005 earnings of only $234 million (RUB6.03 billion). The revenue for the same 2005–2006 period rose by 13.5% to reach $2.77 billion with an 8.7% gain in passenger numbers. Aeroflot was owned by the Russian Government via Rosimushchestvo (51.17%), National Reserve Corporation (27%) and employees and others (19%), and had 14,900 employees.

Expansion and re-organization 

In , the Russian government announced that all regional airlines owned by the state through the holding company Rostechnologii would be consolidated with the national carrier Aeroflot in order to increase the airlines' financial viability. The merger was completed in late  in a deal worth  million, Aeroflot's sister company Aeroflot-Finance became the major shareholder of Vladivostok Avia, Saravia and Rossiya Airlines, and the sole shareholder of both SAT Airlines and Orenair. It was reported in  that Saravia was sold to private investors, as the recent-acquired regional airline was not in line with Aeroflot's business strategy. It was reported in  that in the third quarter of the same year Aeroflot would combine its subsidiaries Vladivostok Air and SAT Airlines into a new subsidiary regional carrier based in the Russian Far East. The new company, 51%-owned by Aeroflot, was expected to link Moscow with the Russian Far East, whereas SAT Airlines and Vladivostok Avia were expected to cease operations in early 2014.

In June 2013, during the World Airline Awards which took place at the  Le Bourget air show, Aeroflot was awarded the international prize as the best air carrier in Eastern Europe. In , the company introduced an affiliated low-cost carrier (LCC), Dobrolet.

In March 2014 as a response to the Revolution of Dignity the company announced rerouting their flights to avoid flying over the territory of Ukraine. The announcement (together with worse than expected financial results) caused an almost 10% drop in the share price of the company. In September 2015, Aeroflot agreed to acquire 75% of Transaero Airlines for the symbolic price of one ruble, but abandoned the plan later after failing to come to terms on a takeover. The carrier did take over a number of Transaero's aircraft by assuming its leases after the defunct airline's collapse. This introduced the Boeing 747 and Boeing 777 to Aeroflot's fleet. In addition, the company suggested that it would cancel some of its jet orders as a result of the newly assumed aircraft.

Following a prior announcement, Aeroflot subsidiaries Rossiya Airlines, Donavia and Orenair combined their operations in late . Orenair AOC was cancelled by Russian authorities in late . Aeroflot filed both Donavia and Orenair for bankruptcy in January 2017. Orenair and Donavia were formally declared bankrupt in February 2017 and August 2017, respectively.

2022 airspace bans and sanctions 
In February 2022, as a result of the Russian invasion of Ukraine, Aeroflot and other Russian airlines were banned from the airspace of countries including the United Kingdom, Iceland, Norway, Canada and also the European Union. On 25 February 2022, Manchester United cancelled a sponsorship agreement that had identified Aeroflot as its official carrier since July 2013, citing the war. On 1 March 2022, the United States closed their airspace to Russian airlines, effectively suspending Aeroflot's operations in the country.  On 3 March 2022, Sabre, the supplier of Aeroflot's Reservation System as well as one of the suppliers of GDS access for Aeroflot internationally, announced that it would terminate Aeroflot's international GDS access; some senior airline industry figures criticised this as not going far enough, since Sabre was not cutting off Aeroflot's main reservation system.

On 5 March 2022, Aeroflot announced that with effect from 8 March it would be suspending all international flights  except Minsk, to avoid any possible seizures of foreign-leased aircraft.

On 11 April 2022 the European Commission declared that Aeroflot will be banned from flying in the European Union because it does not meet international safety standards.  This was due to Russia's forced re-registration of foreign-owned aircraft, knowingly allowing their operation without valid certificates of airworthiness, which is in breach of international aviation safety standards.  The EU Commissioner for Transport Adina Vălean said this practice "poses an immediate safety threat".  She also stated that: "this decision is not another sanction against Russia; it has been taken solely on the basis of technical and safety grounds. We do not mix safety with politics". This safety-related ban is distinct from the other ban enacted in February 2022 in response to the invasion.

On 8 April the US Department of Commerce restricted flights on aircraft manufactured in the US for Aeroflot, Aviastar, Azur Air, Belavia, Rossiya and Utair. It seems the US wants to reclaim ownership of the intellectual property. On 16 June the US broadened its restrictions on the six airlines after violations of the sanctions regime were detected. The effect of the restrictions is to ground the US-manufactured part of its fleet.

As of July 2022, Aeroflot ended its own Sukhoi Superjet 100 operations as these had all gradually been transferred to subsidiary Rossiya Airlines.

As of November 2022, Aeroflot has shown resilience to Western sanctions despite using aircraft manufactured by Boeing and Airbus with these aircraft being subject to sanctions on replacement parts. This success has been due to a reduced flight schedule and cannibalisation of aircraft. The lack of international travel also means less mileage on aircraft as they are being used domestically. Russia hopes to keep its aircraft flying despite the sanctions, much like Iran has. However Aeroflot’s jets are much newer with their purchase on lease from the West starting in 2001. Long term sanctions on replacement parts from the West may have safety implications longer term.

As of January 2023, Aeroflot was maintaining services to Armenia, Azerbaijan, Belarus, China, Egypt, India, Indonesia, Iran, Kyrgyzstan, Maldives, Seychelles, Sri Lanka, Thailand, Turkey,  United Arab Emirates and Uzbekistan.

Corporate affairs

Headquarters 

The headquarters of Aeroflot are in Arbat District, Central Administrative Okrug, Moscow. By 2009 Aeroflot began leasing  of space from a class A office building on Arbat Street owned by Midland Development. As of that year Aeroflot had plans to build a dedicated  headquarters in proximity to Sheremetyevo Airport.

Key people 
, Aeroflot's CEO position is held by Vitaly Savelyev. In late August 2018, Savelyev was re-confirmed in the CEO position for a further five-year period. In December 2018, the Russian government appointed Russia's Minister of Transport Evgeny Ditrich as chairman of the board.

Ownership and subsidiaries 

, Aeroflot was 51% state-owned. The Aeroflot Group, Russia's largest airline holding company, included several subsidiaries: Pobeda, Rossiya, Donavia, Orenair, and Aurora. At that time, the Aeroflot Group employed 30,328; 17,678 of these people worked for Aeroflot JSC.

Aeroflot Airline carried 35.8 million passengers during 2018, an 8.9% increase year-on-year (YOY). The Aeroflot Group, comprising Aeroflot Airline, Aurora, Pobeda and Rossiya, carried 55.7 million passengers during the same period, 11% up YOY. , the Group fleet totalled 366 aircraft, of which 253 corresponded to Aeroflot Airline.

Staffing
In 2016 the company decided to link the pay of its flight attendants to their dress size. All the flight attendants were photographed and measured, and some were weighed. Women above a Russian size 48 were barred from international flights. According to the flight attendants' trade union the policy affected about 600 Aeroflot attendants. The company successfully defended itself in court in April 2017 by saying that a survey of Aeroflot passengers showed that "92% want to see stewardesses who fit into the clothes sizes we are talking about here" and that every extra kilogramme meant spending an extra 800 roubles per year on fuel. The company denied all the accusations of discrimination. In September 2017 the appeal court decided that requirements banning employment by women who wore large sizes was unenforceable and ordered compensation for Yevgenia Magurina, a flight attendant who filed a discrimination suit. Two women were awarded token compensation, but the court did not rule explicitly that the policy was discriminatory.

In November 2018, the company's executive director Vitaly Savelyev signed new rules, according to which employees of the Moscow office of the airline were forbidden to bring and use smartphones at work.

Destinations 

, Aeroflot served 146 destinations in 52 countries.

Alliances 
Aeroflot is a member of SkyTeam, first signing a Memorandum of Understanding (MoU) on 24 May 2004 and becoming a full member in April 2006. Although Aeroflot did not meet the conventional standards of the alliance at the time, SkyTeam saw potential in the airline's large hub networks and decided that it made up for the airline's deficiencies. Aeroflot's cargo branch, Aeroflot-Cargo, which was later reintegrated into the parent company, operated as part of SkyTeam Cargo. On 27 April 2022, SkyTeam and Aeroflot agreed to temporarily suspend the airline's membership.

Codeshare agreements 
As of February 2022, Aeroflot has codeshare agreements with the following airlines. Delta Air Lines and KLM withdrew their codesharing with Aeroflot after the 2022 Russian invasion of Ukraine.

 Aerolíneas Argentinas
 Aeroméxico
 Air Europa
 Air France
 Air Malta
 Air Serbia
 airBaltic
 Aurora
 Bangkok Airways
 Brussels Airlines
 Bulgaria Air
 China Eastern Airlines
 China Southern Airlines
 Czech Airlines
 Etihad Airways
 Finnair
 Garuda Indonesia
 Icelandair
 Japan Airlines
 Kenya Airways
 Korean Air
 LOT Polish Airlines
 MIAT Mongolian Airlines
 Rossiya Airlines
 S7 Airlines
 Saudia
 TAROM
 Vietnam Airlines

As of August 2022, only three codesharing agreements remained, all three subsidiaries of Aeroflot:

 Aurora
 Pobeda
 Rossiya Airlines

Fleet 

The Aeroflot passenger fleet consists of narrow-body and wide-body aircraft from six aircraft families: the Airbus A320, the Airbus A330, the Airbus A350 XWB, the Boeing 737, the Boeing 777, and the Sukhoi Superjet 100. , there are 181 passenger aircraft registered in the Aeroflot fleet.

Frequent flyer programme 

Aeroflot uses Aeroflot Bonus as their frequent-flyer programme. It has four levels with various perks.

Accidents and incidents 

Aeroflot has had a high number of fatal crashes, with a total of 8,231 passengers dying in Aeroflot crashes according to the Aircraft Crashes Record Office, mostly during the Soviet-era, about five times more than any other airline. From 1946 to 1989, the carrier was involved in 721 incidents. In 2013, AirlineRatings.com reported that five of the ten aircraft models involved in the highest numbers of fatal accidents were old Soviet models. From 1992 to 2020, the carrier was involved in 14 incidents.

See also 

 List of airports in Russia
 Transport in Russia
 Transport in the Soviet Union

References

Bibliography

External links 

  

 
Airlines established in 1923
Airlines of Russia
Airlines of the Soviet Union
Arbat District
Companies based in Moscow
Companies listed on the Moscow Exchange
Former Aeroflot divisions
Government-owned airlines
Soviet brands
Government-owned companies of Russia
Russian brands
SkyTeam
1923 establishments in the Soviet Union